Prandi may refer to:

People
Giulio Prandi, Italian conductor and musicologist
Jonathon Prandi (born 1972), American male fashion model, actor and IT consultant
Kyle Prandi (born 1979), American diver
Silvano Prandi (born 1947), Italian volleyball coach 
Enrichetta Thea Prandi (1922-1961), Italian actress and singer

Places
Prandi (river), Estonia
Prandi, Estonia, village in Estonia